The 1986 Connecticut Huskies football team represented the University of Connecticut in the 1986 NCAA Division I-AA football season.  The Huskies were led by fourth-year head coach Tom Jackson, and completed the season with a record of 8–3.

Schedule

References

Connecticut
UConn Huskies football seasons
Yankee Conference football champion seasons
Connecticut Huskies football